Bangarang is the fourth extended play (EP) by American electronic music producer Skrillex. It was released on December 23, 2011, via Beatport while being released on other digital retailers on December 27, 2011. It was released on January 24, 2012, as a physical CD. It was announced via Skrillex's Twitter page on December 12, 2011, that the EP was completed, while the release date was also announced on December 21. The EP is mostly a collection of songs that have been previously performed during The Mothership Tour (with the exception of "Right on Time"). It features collaborations with the Doors, Sirah, Wolfgang Gartner, 12th Planet, Kill the Noise and Ellie Goulding. Musically, Bangarang has multiple influences of electro, dubstep and techno, while also incorporating elements of eurodance, drum and bass, rap rock, experimental rock and ska. It features syncopated rhythmic build-ups, technical breakdowns and "chopped-up" vocal hooks, as well as multiple vocal samples. An orchestral song was also featured as a bonus track on the iTunes edition.

Bangarang received mixed reviews from music critics. The EP was a commercial success upon release, charting within Australia, Canada, New Zealand, Norway, Switzerland, the United Kingdom and the United States. Its lead single, "Bangarang", charted in multiple countries worldwide and reached the top 10 in Australia and Belgium. Due to strong digital sales following the EP's release, "Kyoto" and "Breakn' a Sweat" charted in multiple countries as well. "Breakn' a Sweat" was featured in the 2012 documentary film Re:Generation. Music videos have been released for "Breakn' a Sweat", "Summit" and "Bangarang". The EP had sold 595,000 copies in the United States by March 2014, and on July 11, 2016, it was certified gold by the Recording Industry Association of America (RIAA).

Composition
Musically, while Bangarang prominently uses elements of electro house, dubstep and progressive house, it is more diverse than his previous material, including multiple influences of trance, drum and bass, rap rock, experimental rock and ska. It uses syncopated rhythmic build-ups, technical breakdowns, "chopped-up" vocal hooks and vocal samples throughout its composition.

The first track, "Right In", has multiple influences of dubstep and electro house and has been described as "one long adrenaline rush of stabbing keyboard chords, sawed-off vocal samples and Skrillex's trademark: squirming, squalling synth lines". It has also been compared to the opener on his previous remix EP More Monsters and Sprites, "First of the Year (Equinox)". The title track, "Bangarang", also uses heavy influences of Moombahcore and has been compared to the previous track on the EP. It uses "chopped-up vocal hooks" performed by American rapper Sirah, with the last line of the song saying "I'm eating Fun Dip right now/Not givin' a fuck". It has been described as having a "concussive collection of blips and bursts that sounds like something Moby might hear in his head during a heart attack". Breakn' a Sweat was written for the 2012 documentary film Re:Generation. It has been described as combining "proggy guitar hooks, psychedelic organ chords, and Jim Morrison samples with a snarling, Prodigy-esque vocal and a filthy slab of dub bass". It has been highlighted as the most unusual track on the EP by several music critics. "The Devil's Den" features guest contributions from Wolfgang Gartner and has been described as "Daft Punk-go-Dirty Vegas". It uses elements of trance, techno, ska and rave.

"Right On Time" has been described as "a percussive, hard house collaboration with 12th Planet and Kill the Noise which eventually builds into a feverish slice of happy hardcore", and although it has been complimented for its uniqueness in comparison with the rest of the EP, its use of repetition has been criticized. "Kyoto" is a "rap-metal fusion" that is the second track on the EP to feature Sirah. It has been compared to rap rock artists such as Linkin Park and Travis Barker. "Summit" is the final track on the EP (with the exception of the iTunes edition) and features English singer-songwriter Ellie Goulding. It is an electronic song that has elements of chillstep and uses Skrillex's "chopped up", Auto-Tune vocals. Goulding's vocals have been described as "ethereal" and "delicate". The iTunes edition of the EP includes an "Orchestral Suite" performed by Varien.

Critical reception

Bangarang received generally mixed reviews from critics. At Metacritic, which assigns a normalized rating out of 100 to reviews from mainstream publications, the album received an average score of 60, based on 10 reviews. Dan LeRoy of Alternative Press felt that the EP's "go-for-the-throat" songs and "uncomplicated, catchy fun" do not reveal "much about Skrillex's long-term prospects." Evan Rytlewski of The A.V. Club said that, although Skrillex is a "more skillful producer than his detractors give him credit for", he still resorts to "gimmicks" in order to reach his audience. Gavin Haynes of NME found his music artificial, albeit with occasionally "good results". AllMusic's Jon O'Brien observed a "lack of progression" from Skrillex and called the EP "disappointingly formulaic". He also felt that even the more unconventional songs are "more headache-inducing than thrilling." Deviant of Sputnikmusic panned its songs as "the same big-boy slab of molten bass drops and screeching whistles", but without a "spark" or "sense of attitude", and accused Skrillex of producing "the same half-assed bass trends".

In a positive review for MSN Music, Robert Christgau called Bangarang an "electronical vista" and said it is "a pop record because its shamelessly hedonistic barrage of proven dancefloor tricks will obviously be more fun at home than in a club." August Brown of the Los Angeles Times felt that, although Skrillex continues his "singular, manic sound", the "quick" tracks that defined his previous work are "more skillful and sonically intriguing". Ben Rayner of the Toronto Star found it "far smarter than Skrillex's reputation for doling out cheap, bludgeoning bass-bin thrills would let on", and wrote that it displays "a remarkable gift for bending innumerable breeds of club music to his will". Garrett Kamps of Spin called it "spracked out and ridiculous and fun and sometimes disposable". Rolling Stone magazine's Jon Dolan called Skrillex "a magician" whose "trick is turning the elusively thwumping U.K. dance music called dubstep into high-fiving dance-floor heavy metal."

Rolling Stone later named Bangarang the fourteenth greatest EDM album of all time. Christgau named it the sixth best album of 2012 in his list for The Barnes & Noble Review. Bangarang won the Best Dance/Electronica Album award at the 55th Grammy Awards, as well as the Best Dance Recording award for the title track.

Track listing

Charts

Weekly charts

Year-end charts

Certifications

References

2011 EPs
Big Beat Records (American record label) EPs
Grammy Award for Best Dance/Electronica Album
Owsla EPs
Skrillex albums